Brunnichia ovata is a species of the buckwheat family that is found in North America. It was reassigned from the genus Rajania to Brunnichia by Lloyd Shinners in the publication Sida in 1967. Formerly it had been placed in Rajania by Thomas Walter in Flora Caroliniana in 1778. Brunnichia ovata plants grow near riverbanks, the perimeters of lakes, wet woods and thickets. This species is found in the buckwheat family, Polygonaceae. Brunnichia ovata is referred to by two other common names including American buckwheat vine and redvine.

Description
Brunnichia ovata is made up of an alternate leaf arrangement of its simple leaves. It is regarded as deciduous and the blades of its leaves are ovate or having an oval shape. Its leaves can range anywhere from 2 to 5 inches in length and its petioles are usually short. The flowering of the Brunnichia ovata species is typically seen from June to July and they are greenish in color. The fruit of the species is coined by its common name, “ear-drops” due to its appearance of hanging earrings. The stems shows proximal portions to be woody and the distal portions of the shoots to be herbaceous. Hence the species is regarded as a semi-woody vine. The optimum temperature found for germination of the species is 35 °C in both soil and Petri dishes. Below or above, 25 °C and 40 °C, respectively will yield no germination or emergence. Furthermore it requires altitude ranges of 0 to 200 meters and can grow up to 40 feet tall.

Geographic distribution
Brunnichia ovata is a native vine to North America. Due to its need for wet woods and riverbanks it is typically found in Southeastern regions of North America specifically coastal plains from Texas to Alabama, as far north as southern Illinois, and eastward to Georgia.

Uses 
There are no known uses for this species. Brunnichia ovata, however, is known to present as a pest for certain crops because of its growth habit within crops. This may hinder the growth of many crops. Such crops include soybean crops as is seen on the Mississippi Delta.

Taxonomy
Brunnichia ovata is a species part of the genus Brunnichia also known by its common name, buckwheat vine. Brunnichia is part of the family Polygonaceae which are commonly known as the knotweed family and American buckwheat family. The name is derived from the Greek 'poly' which means 'many' and 'gone' meaning 'knee'  because of the many nodes found on many species within this family.

References

Polygonaceae